Dominion Road is an arterial road in Auckland, New Zealand, running north–south across most of the Auckland isthmus. It is a major public transport route that carries 50,000 bus passengers each week, making it one of the few roads in Auckland on which similar or greater numbers of people travel by public transport than by private car.

The road, which passes through mostly suburban areas (and several town centres), has been described as having a colourful mix of shops, exemplified by areas like the "United Nations of restaurants" around the Balmoral town centre. There are claims that the road's development has been held back by uncertainty about future roading / public transport development plans for the last decade, which prevented investment certainty, and led to low shop rents.

In international popular culture, Dominion Road achieved some fame by The Mutton Birds' 1992 song titled "Dominion Road".

Route

The road begins in Eden Terrace as a continuation of Ian McKinnon Drive, which itself begins at upper Queen Street. Ian McKinnon Drive becomes Dominion Road south of a grade-separated intersection over New North Road (grade separation of non-motorway intersections is rare in Auckland). The road then continues in a straight line for almost 6 kilometres (the longest straight stretch of road on the Auckland Isthmus), going through the suburbs of Mt Eden, Balmoral and Mt Roskill until bending slightly just before its intersection with Richardson Road at the Mt Roskill South Shops. Dominion Road Extension then continues until it ends at Hillsborough Road in Waikowhai, overlooking the Manukau Harbour on the southern side of the Auckland isthmus.

History

The road was created in the late 1840s by Cornish settler John Walters, who made the path to better connect his farm (at modern-day Bellevue Road) to Eden Terrace in the north. The road was developed in the 1860s, and for much of its early life was known as Mt Roskill Road. The road's name was changed in 1907, to celebrate the proclamation of New Zealand becoming a Dominion. In the 1910s, the road stopped at Landscape Road (then known as Boundary Road), as further to the south, a series of small hills known to early Aucklanders as the Kopjes hindered travel.

The road was extended to the south in the 1920s, and in 1929 the road to the south which met Hillsborough Road, Arkell Road, was renamed as Dominion Road Extension.

1960s motorway proposal 
Dominion Road, in the extremely car-centric transport plans for Auckland of the 1950s and 1960s, featured as a proposed new motorway route south from the CBD. However, with the exception of the oversized Ian McKinnon Drive / New North Road interchange, this proposal never came to pass. In 2014 a proposal was made to demolish the interchange.

2010s public transport upgrade proposal
In late 2010, a proposed Council upgrade to the road, which was to focus on improving public transport and cycling links (via 24/7 bus lanes and cycle lanes), created substantial public debate. Conflicting views existed on whether the necessary removal of parking (a good part of which was to be reinstated in side roads as extra angle parking) would significantly harm the road, reducing amenity for locals, and endangering the street's shops. Further heavily criticised was the concurrent proposal by the Citizens & Ratepayers-dominated Council to remove the bus lanes and replace them with transit lanes allowing cars.

The proposed upgrade was eventually tabled to be revisited only after the elections creating the first unified Auckland Council. The new Council decided in 2011 to proceed with a less extensive plan that would provide only some extensions and upgrades of bus lanes and cycling facilities, and would retain parking in the bus lanes outside of peak hours, a move that was applauded by some local business owners. Road widening designations, and previous Council land purchases worth about $20 million, that would have allowed for the more extensive works will partially be lifted / sold around 2012, as soon as the extent of the new scheme is known.

Rapid transit plans 

In January 2015 Auckland Transport initiated a study of building new rapid transit routes to replace buses on some of its most heavily used bus routes. Dominion Road was one of the six rapid transit routes being studied that had originally been routes on Auckland's old tram network.

Mutton Birds song

Dominion Road was immortalised in song in 1992 by Don McGlashan, the song being recorded by his band, The Mutton Birds. The song caused some local debate for its reference to "a halfway house half way down Dominion Road". This may be a reference to The Salvation Army Auckland Bridge Programme, on Ewington Street. The line caused many New Zealanders to wonder exactly where "halfway down Dominion Road" is, as an extension has been built to this road. However, the extension was built after the song was written.

The song's music video suggests that halfway down Dominion Road is the intersection of Peary Road and Dominion Road, and much of the video's footage shows the area between the road's Balmoral shops and Mt. Roskill shops. In 2013 a brass plaque was placed in the footpath by an anonymous artist to mark the halfway point along the road.

Major intersections

References

External links
 Urban Route 4 – Dominion Road at Auckland Motorways (private website)

Streets in Auckland